Andrew McNally (1838–1904) was an American publisher, co-founder of Rand McNally & Company.

Andrew McNally may also refer to:
Andrew McNally III (1909–2001), American printer and publisher
Andrew McNally (baseball) (born 1973), Australian baseball player

See also
Andy McNally (born 1982), British rugby player